is a Japanese light heavyweight mixed martial artist. Adachi was born in Sapporo, Hokkaido, Japan. He fought as a professional mixed martial artist from Paraesta Matsudo in Matsudo, Chiba Prefecture beginning in 2000. Adachi was the top amateur Shooto light heavyweight in 2002, and was named the Shooto cruiserweight rookie of the year in 2003. Adachi's last bout was in 2006 and he formally retired from mixed martial arts in 2008.

Adachi is an accomplished judoka, having reached the rank of 4th degree black belt. He is also attained the rank of black belt in Brazilian Jiu-Jitsu in 2011. Adachi is a real estate agent, a profession he held throughout his mixed martial arts career, and continues to instruct from Paraesta Matsudo.

Mixed martial arts record 

|-
| Win					
| align=center| 4–4–2
| Nobuyasu Fujikawa
| TKO (Punches)
| Shooto: Gig North 2
| 
| align=center| 2
| align=center| 1:00
| Hokkaido, Japan
| 
|-
| Loss					
| align=center| 3–4–2
| Akihiro Murayama
| Submission (Armbar)
| Shooto: Shooting Disco 2: The Heat Rises Tonight
| 
| align=center| 2
| align=center| 2:29
| Tokyo, Japan
| 
|-
| Loss				
| align=center| 3–3–2
| Masashi Yozen
| TKO (Punches)
| Shooto: Back To Our Roots 3
| 
| align=center| 2
| align=center| 1:26
| Tokyo, Japan
| 
|-
| Draw
| align=center| 3–2–2
| Akihiro Murayama
| Draw
| Shooto 2006: 10/1 in Kitazawa Town Hall
| 
| align=center| 2
| align=center| 5:00
| Tokyo, Japan
| 
|-
| Loss
| align=center| 3–2–1
| Hiroki Ozaki
| Decision (Unanimous)
| GCM - D.O.G 2
| 
| align=center| 2
| align=center| 5:00
| Tokyo, Japan
| 
|-
| Draw
| align=center| 3–1–1
| Katsuhiko Ochiai
| Draw
| Shooto - 11/25 in Kitazawa Town Hall
| 
| align=center| 2
| align=center| 5:00
| Tokyo, Japan
| 
|-
| Win
| align=center| 3–1
| Yosuke Mikami
| Decision (Unanimous)
| Shooto - 9/5 in Korakuen Hall
| 
| align=center| 2
| align=center| 5:00
| Tokyo, Japan
| 
|-
| Loss
| align=center| 2–1
| Masaya Inoue
| Decision (Unanimous)
| Shooto: Gig East 9
| 
| align=center| 2
| align=center| 5:00
| Tokyo, Japan
| 
|-
| Win
| align=center| 2–0
| Kassim Annan
| Submission (Rear Naked Choke)
| Shooto - Gig East 7
| 
| align=center| 1
| align=center| 3:46
| Tokyo, Japan
| 
|-
| Win
| align=center| 1–0
| Jun Ishii
| Decision (Majority)
| Shooto - Gig East 4
| 
| align=center| 2
| align=center| 5:00
| Tokyo, Japan
|

See also
 List of male mixed martial artists
 List of current mixed martial arts champions

References

1965 births
Living people
Japanese male mixed martial artists
Middleweight mixed martial artists
Mixed martial artists utilizing judo
Mixed martial artists utilizing Brazilian jiu-jitsu
Japanese male judoka
Japanese practitioners of Brazilian jiu-jitsu
People awarded a black belt in Brazilian jiu-jitsu
Sportspeople from Sapporo